Mount Pleasant Baptist Church and Cemetery  a historic Baptist church and cemetery located in Gainesville, Prince William County, Virginia along U.S. Route 29. It was added to the National Register of Historic Places in 2021.

History
The Mount Pleasant Baptist Church was established in the 1870s, serving as a social and religious congregation site in a Black neighborhood known as The Settlement on land that was purchased after the American Civil War. The current church building was built in 1928, replacing another church building built in 1889. The earlier building replaced a log church that was burnt down, possibly due to arson, and relocated to its current site by trustees in 1882. Throughout the 20th century, the church has had several additions to the rear side of the building.

On August 10, 2012, the church building survived an arson attack, which left the original part of the building mostly intact despite some smoke damage and broken windows, but caused severe damages to the latter rear-side additions of the building. However, it was not until almost 8 years later in June 2020, following the murder of George Floyd and the arise of subsequent protests that the church's reparation efforts were given widespread attention. To assist in funding the church's now 5-year long campaign to repair the church, Delegate Danica Roem started a GoFundMe campaign, which raised over $20,000 in the span of two days and doubled the church's $10,000 goal for the first phase of the $100,000 total cost of reparations of the building.

In September 2020, attempts to block a plan for development nearby the church were rejected by Prince William County supervisors. Previously, attempts to block Dominion Energy from constructing power lines through the area were successful.

On December 10, 2020, the Virginia Department of Historic Resources added Mount Pleasant Baptist Church and Cemetery to the Virginia Landmarks Register. Months later on February 19, 2021, the National Park Service added the church and cemetery site to the National Register of Historic Places.

References

External links
 Official website

Baptist churches in Virginia
Churches on the National Register of Historic Places in Virginia
Churches completed in 1928
Buildings and structures in Prince William County, Virginia
National Register of Historic Places in Prince William County, Virginia